Yegor Romanovich Spiridonov (born 22 January 2001) is a Russian ice hockey forward who plays for SKA-Neva in the VHL. Spiridonov made his KHL debut for SKA Saint Petersburg during the 2020–21 KHL season. He was drafted by the San Jose Sharks in the fourth round of the 2019 NHL Entry Draft with the 108th pick overall.

Career statistics

Regular season and playoffs

International

References

External links
 

2001 births
Living people
People from Magnitogorsk
Russian ice hockey centres
San Jose Sharks draft picks
SKA-1946 players
SKA-Neva players
SKA Saint Petersburg players
Stalnye Lisy players
Zauralie Kurgan players
Sportspeople from Chelyabinsk Oblast